John Fitzgerald Coates (born January 1970), is an English billionaire businessman and the joint chief executive (CEO) of online gambling company bet365 and joint-chairman of Stoke City.

Early life
John Fitzgerald Coates was born in January 1970, the son of Peter Coates, chairman of Stoke City F.C. and director of Bet365.  He attended Bristol University where he studied Law.

Business career
Coates started his career as a lawyer. In 2001, after selling some of their father's betting shops to large bookmaker Coral, his sister convinced him to join her in launching bet365.

Bet365
John and his sister Denise Coates are co-CEOs of UK-based bet365, an online gambling company, of which he owns a quarter.

Bet365 Foundation
John helped Denise set-up the Bet365 Foundation in August 2012 and it has donated £100 million to 20 UK charities to help support projects home and abroad.

Charities which have received funds include Oxfam, CAFOD, the Douglas Macmillan Hospice for cancer sufferers in Stoke, and relief programmes for victims caught in the aftermath of Typhoon Haiyan in the Philippines. University scholarships and theatre donations have also been offered.

Stoke City
In July 2015 Coates was appointed as vice-chairman at Stoke City F.C. where his father is chairman. In September 2020, Coates was appointed as joint-chairman alongside his father.

Personal life
He is married, with two children, and lives in Stoke-on-Trent.

References

1970 births
Living people
English chief executives
Bookmakers
People from Stoke-on-Trent
British billionaires
Stoke City F.C. directors and chairmen
John
Alumni of the University of Bristol